Forward March Hare is a 1952 Warner Bros. Looney Tunes cartoon directed by Chuck Jones. The short was released on February 14, 1953, and stars Bugs Bunny.

Plot
The mailman has delivered a letter to "B. Bonny" (Bertram Bonny), but when the truck pulls out, the exhaust from the tailpipe causes the letter to drift out of the mailbox and accidentally drop into Bugs Bunny's hole. Bugs, in the middle of his morning workout (including a brief workout of his ears), eventually sees the letter and assumes it is for him (regardless of the slightly different surname); his response after reading it is a shocked "Holy cats, I've been drafted!"

Bugs' going through the United States Army induction center only causes some small reactions:

 After asking a guard for directions, the guard, after seeing Bugs go up the stairs, assumes "So they're inducting rabbits."
 Before Bugs has his X-rays taken, a tall, lanky, tiny-headed person behind him looks down at him and in response looks and chuckles at the audience. When the doctor sees Bugs' skeleton, he assumes he (the doctor) has been overworked.
 Bugs also passes the eye exam with flying colors from the first letter right down to the microscopic "Reg. U.S. Pat. Off." disclaimer at the bottom of the chart. This joke is a reference to Bugs eating a steady diet of carrots, rich in Vitamin A, which promotes good eyesight. A similar gag was previously used in Hot Cross Bunny.

Once in the army, though, he quickly causes problems. His shoes are too big, so when his sergeant calls for the men lined up to "about face," Bugs accidentally literally knocks the rest of the line over like bowling pins.

 The sergeant calls Bugs forward, where Bugs introduces himself as "Private Bugs Bunny reporting, your majesty, sir!" The sergeant does not believe it is really Bugs, and sarcastically refers to himself as "Sergeant Porky Pig." However, his colonel replies "And I am Colonel Putty Tat. General Tweety Pie was asking about you, Sergeant." When the Colonel inspects Bugs and orders him to "about face," Bugs knocks over the colonel with his large shoes.

As punishment, Bugs and the sergeant — now noticeably demoted to three stripes ("buck" sergeant) — take a long hike that sees both of them crawling back to their bunk (at "Camp Ono" — Ono, Pennsylvania also happens to be a hamlet near Fort Indiantown Gap, a former Army base) in the middle of the night. Bugs, after peeling back his sweating shoes, finally lies down in his bunk but is woken by "Reveille" seconds later. Bugs, intending to "moider that bugler," runs out with a baseball bat and a "whack" is heard off-screen. After Bugs decides to take a bath, it is shown that Bugs really smashed a record player.

Later that morning, the colonel is furiously looking for his helmet. The sergeant finds Bugs taking his bath, using the colonel's helmet as his bathtub. After Bugs makes a comment about cleanliness being next to godliness, the sergeant throws Bugs out and runs off with the helmet full of soapy water — only to run into the colonel. The colonel then puts his helmet on and gets splashed, blowing out soap bubbles afterwards.

Now demoted to corporal, Bugs' drillmaster has Bugs "clean and dress" every one of a shipment of chickens for the officer's dinner dance that night — though Bugs has them all dressed in tuxedos.

Bugs then tries to nail a calendar to the wall above his bunk using a large ammunition shell instead of a hammer, which causes all the neighboring soldiers to flee their quarters in a panic. The corporal runs up just in time to almost get hit with the shell when it goes off — but, much to the corporal's shock, the shell pierces clean through the angry colonel's helmet, making him look like the devil.

Now reduced in rank to private, Bugs' former drill sergeant asks the now-bandaged Bugs Bunny what he has against him, asking him why he does not listen to orders, assuming Bugs is causing problems on purpose and hoping to reason with him ("What have you got against me, anyways? Why don't you listen to orders? You've got ears just like the other guys."). As he does, he starts to mention his long ears and then his fur and tail, and finally realizes "Jumping catfish! We've inducted a rabbit!", and runs off to inform his superiors.

The general apologizes to Bugs for the mix-up, explaining that Congress did not pass any laws saying that rabbits could be inducted into the military. Bugs, however, wants to do his part for the military. The general tells Bugs there is something he can do — Bugs is then seen testing ammunition shells by striking the top with a mallet and marking them as DUD when they do not explode. Bugs then tells the audience, "And just think! In 30 years, I can retire!"

Home media
This cartoon is available on the Stars of Space Jam: Bugs Bunny VHS, and on the fourth volume of the Looney Tunes Golden Collection

References

External links

1953 films
1953 animated films
1953 short films
1950s Warner Bros. animated short films
Looney Tunes shorts
Short films directed by Chuck Jones
Korean War films
Military humor in film
Films scored by Carl Stalling
Bugs Bunny films
Films with screenplays by Michael Maltese
1950s English-language films
Films about the United States Army